In Marvel Comics, Giant-Girl refers to:

 an informal codename briefly used by Cassandra Lang
 a codename used by Janet van Dyne in the Marvel Adventures continuity